Elena Raffalovich (1842-1918), was a Russian educator. A noted figure within the pioneers of the Kindergarten, she was foremost active in Italy.

References 
 Duilio Gasparini, Adolfo Pick. Il pensiero e l'opera, 3 voll., Biblioteca Nazionale Pedagogica, Firenze, 1968

1842 births
1918 deaths
19th-century educators from the Russian Empire
Russian educators